"It's Goin' Down" is the debut single by American hip hop artist Yung Joc, released in May 9, 2006. It is from his debut album New Joc City. The song was written by Yung Joc and Chadron Moore, and was produced by Nitti.

Composition
The song is part of the snap genre, popular in hip hop music from the Southern United States. The title is slang for describing a "good time."

Music video
Directed by Lenny Bass, a music video for "It's Goin' Down" was filmed in early March 2006. It took place at various locations in the Atlanta area, including the corner of Rocky Ford Road and Hosea Williams Drive at the Kirkwood neighborhood and a clothing store in Belvedere Plaza. Yung Joc and other cast members ride in the 1969 Oldsmobile Cutlass. Making cameos in this video included rapper Killer Mike, two members of the R&B group Cherish, and producer Nitti.

Commercial performance
"It's Goin' Down" performed very well in the U.S., peaking at number 3 on the Billboard Hot 100 on June 24, 2006. It peaked at number 1 on the Billboard Hot R&B/Hip-Hop Songs chart for eight weeks beginning on June 3, 2006.

This single and successor "I Know You See It" both earned Platinum RIAA certification on December 14, 2006 for selling one million copies.

Critical reception and awards
David Jeffries of allmusic called the song "a simple, familiar-sounding bit of Southern weekend music that withstands numerous replays." Sonia Murray of Yung Joc's hometown Atlanta Journal-Constitution newspaper described the beat as having "sharp, insistent keyboards" and the lyrics as "simple...[but] infectious."

Comparing Yung Joc's rapping style to "a senior citizen on the MARTA," Brian Sims of HipHopDX called the song "hypnotic, even if the flow is not" and "nothing fancy, just bar after monotonous bar."  Tom Breihan of Pitchfork was even more critical, describing the song as "basically filler itself" due to being "just a clicking drumbeat, a maddeningly repetitive synth line, and a swaggery brag-rap."

In year-end lists, Rolling Stone ranked "It's Goin' Down" no. 79 in its year-end "100 Best Songs of the Year" list in 2006 for showing "the power of a pure, synthy snap beat and a singsongy rhyme." The January 2007 issue of Vibe ranked the song 15th in its "60 Songs of '06" list.

"It's Goin' Down" was a nominee for the Grammy Award for Best Rap Song in 2007, which went to "Money Maker" by Ludacris featuring Pharrell. However, it won the Hip-Hop Track of the Year award at the BET Awards 2006.

Remixes
Five remixes were made for this song: the official remix features Rick Ross, Slim Thug, and Jody Breeze; one adds a verse by Cam'ron to the official remix; one features Trae; the last features Lil Wayne, Rick Ross and Currency. Rapper Lydell Lucky made a remix to the song as well, which features Paul Wall, Trae and others.

Charts

Weekly charts

Year-end charts

Certifications

References

2005 songs
2006 debut singles
Yung Joc songs
Bad Boy Records singles
Snap songs
Songs written by Nitti (producer)
Hip hop dance